Todd Woodbridge and Mark Woodforde were the three-time defending champions, but retired from their second round match this year.

Ellis Ferreira and Rick Leach won the title, defeating Alex O'Brien and Jonathan Stark 6–2, 6–4 in the final.

Seeds

Draw

Finals

Top half

Section 1

Section 2

Bottom half

Section 3

Section 4

References

 Main Draw

Men's Doubles
1998 ATP Tour